Amanda Jane Cooper is an American actress and singer best known for playing Glinda in Wicked and for her guest role as Susan Channing on Jessie. Cooper grew up in Valley Forge, Pennsylvania. She earned a BFA from Carnegie Mellon University.

Filmography

Film

Television

References 

Living people
Year of birth missing (living people)
Carnegie Mellon University College of Fine Arts alumni
21st-century American actresses
American musical theatre actresses
American television actresses
Broadway theatre people
People from Chester County, Pennsylvania